The Investment Building is a 1927 neo-classical skyscraper in Pittsburgh, Pennsylvania located at 239 Fourth Avenue and part of the Fourth Avenue Historic District.  The original name of the structure was the Insurance Exchange Building.

Designed by John M. Donn, a Washington, D.C. architect, the tower is of the same approximate façade dimensions as its 4th Avenue neighbors the Arrott Building and Benedum-Trees Building, both built a generation earlier.  Constructed from limestone, and a darker, more textured brick, the tower is noted for simplicity and lightness of form and detailing. The roof corners feature chamfered obelisk-like elements.

References

Skyscraper office buildings in Pittsburgh
Neoclassical architecture in Pennsylvania
Office buildings completed in 1927